Graham Southern (born 21 September 1960) is an English art dealer and gallery owner. In 1994, Southern was the Founding Director of Christie's (London) Post-War & Contemporary Art Department which he ran until 2001, leaving to become a director of the Anthony d'Offay Gallery. In 2002, he founded Haunch of Venison gallery with Harry Blain. The gallery represented, amongst others, Turner Prize winners Richard Long and Keith Tyson.

In 2007, Blain and Southern sold Haunch of Venison to Christie's International plc. Southern remained within the business and continued to run the gallery with Blain when they both left to launch BlainSouthern in 2010. The gallery was originally based at 21 Dering Street, but moved to 4 Hanover Square in October 2012.

Together with Blain, Southern staged many acclaimed exhibitions while at Haunch of Venison, including major surveys of Abstract Expressionism and late twentieth century Russian art in New York and London respectively; in Berlin they put on an exhibition with Damien Hirst and Michael Joo in 2010

In 2010, Southern and Blain were cited in an Evening Standard survey as being among the most influential people in London. They also featured in the 2010 Art + Auction Power 100

Citations

Living people
1960 births
Art dealers from London